Petrăchioaia is a commune in the east of Ilfov County, Muntenia, Romania. It is composed of four villages: Măineasca, Surlari, Petrăchioaia and Vânători. Its name is a feminine form of Petrache, which in turn is a name of Greek origin, derived from Petrakis.

References

Communes in Ilfov County
Localities in Muntenia